The Graduates is a 2008 American independent coming-of-age teen comedy film directed and written by Ryan Gielen. The film follows four friends—Ben (Rob Bradford), Andy (Blake Merriman), Mattie (Nick Vergara), and Nickie (Michael Pennacchio)—who head to Ocean City, Maryland to celebrate their high school graduation.

Plot
18-year-old Ben, fresh out of high school in Maryland, is heading to Senior Week to hang out with friends, party, and chase the hottest girl in high school, Annie. While waiting outside a liquor store in Columbia for his older brother Josh, Ben is talking to himself when Brian, Josh's friend, overhears him, embarrassing Ben. Josh comes out of the store and hands Ben a bag of liquor. The two drive to pick up Ben's three friends, Andy, Mattie, and Nickie.

After picking up the trio, the group heads off to Ocean City. During the drive, the group has discussions about sex, which highlights the group's naïveté and their limited understanding of sex .

Upon arriving in Ocean City the group gets drunk and goes to a party. Josh attempts to instruct the younger guys on seducing women, telling them "the secret" about female body language. Annie, Ben's crush, enters the party, and her entrance completely distracts Ben. He sits down next to Annie and starts to flirt with her. As Ben and Annie begin to kiss, Nickie gets into a fight, which ends up causing Annie to leave and brings an early end to the party.

The next day, the group goes out on the town and cruises the boardwalk. They end up back at Ben's condo and play Asshole. Andy becomes president and declares that Nickie must toast him. After a brief verbal spat, Ben becomes Vice President and calls for a confession. After a descriptive story from Josh about losing his virginity, the boys stumble into an awkward conversation about divorce.

Throughout the ensuing week, the young men encounter a multitude of zany characters and situations.

Cast

Production 
The film is the feature-length directorial debut of Maryland native Ryan Gielen, who previously directed short films with his brother Matthew, a producer for the film. 

It was shot on location in Ocean City, Maryland in September of 2007. 

The film is also the feature film debut of Zak Williams, son of actor Robin Williams.

Music
The film has three original composed songs by Seth Freeman. Indie rock band The New Rags also have three songs featured in the film.

Release 
The film premiered at the Rhode Island International Film Festival on August 6, 2008. The filmmakers used grassroots campaigning to promote the film and held screenings along the East coast. The film was also shown at the Myrtle Beach International Film Festival on December 2, 2008.

Awards and honors
At the Rhode Island Film Festival, the film was given the Directorial Discovery Award.

References

External links

 
 The Graduates at Believe Limited
 

2008 films
2000s English-language films
2000s coming-of-age comedy-drama films
2000s buddy comedy-drama films
American coming-of-age comedy-drama films
Films set in Maryland
American independent films
American sex comedy films
American teen comedy-drama films
Ocean City, Maryland
2000s sex comedy films
2008 comedy films
2008 directorial debut films
2008 independent films
Beach party films
Eastern Shore of Maryland in fiction
2000s American films